The Piel CP.90 Pinocchio II was a single-seat, single-engine aerobatic sport aircraft developed in France and marketed for homebuilding. The design was based on that of Piel's Emeraude and was unrelated to Piel's first design named Pinocchio, the CP.10 and indirectly to the second, the CP.20. It was a cantilever, low-wing monoplane of conventional design with an enclosed cockpit and fixed, tailwheel undercarriage. Construction was of wood throughout.

Although Piel commenced work on the design in 1965, the first example did not fly until 1986.

Specifications

Notes

References
 
 
 
 

1980s French sport aircraft
Piel aircraft
Homebuilt aircraft
Aerobatic aircraft
Single-engined tractor aircraft
Low-wing aircraft
Aircraft first flown in 1986